The Hyderabad Metropolitan Development Authority (HMDA) is the urban planning agency of Hyderabad in the Indian state of Telangana. HMDA was formed by the merging of the following erstwhile entities: Hyderabad Urban Development Authority (HUDA), Hyderabad Airport Development Authority (HADA), Cyberabad Development Authority (CDA) and Buddha Poornima Project Authority (BPPA). HMDA was set up for the purposes of planning, co-ordination, supervising, promoting and securing the planned development of the Hyderabad Metropolitan Region. It coordinates the development activities of the municipal corporations, municipalities and other local authorities, the Hyderabad Metropolitan Water Supply & Sewerage Board, the Telangana State Transmission Corporation, the Telangana State Infrastructure Corporation.

Outer Ring Road 
HMDA built the Outer Ring Road at a cost of 6696 crores. The project started in 2005 and was completed in May 2018.

HUMTA
In 2019, Municipal Administration and Urban Development (MA&UD) department, Telangana  decided to revive the Hyderabad Urban Metropolitan Transport Authority (HUMTA). HUMTA is a wing of Hyderabad Metropolitan Development Authority (HMDA). HUMTA acts as an umbrella for various agencies that are connected to traffic and transportation issues to ensure last-mile connectivity in Hyderabad.

Jurisdiction 
The areas under Hyderabad Metropolitan Development Authority include districts of Hyderabad district, Medchal district, part of Rangareddy district, Bhuvanagiri district, Sangareddy district,Nalgonda district, Medak district and Siddipet district. The metropolitan region covers seven districts, 70 mandals, and 1032 villages, including Greater Hyderabad Municipal Corporation which consists of 175 villages and 12 municipalities / nagar panchayats consisting of 31 villages.

Development charges 
The Government approved a 50 per cent increase in the development charges for the builders for construction of buildings in the extended areas of the HMDA.

References 

State agencies of Telangana
Organisations based in Hyderabad, India
State urban development authorities of India
Urban development authorities of Telangana
Government of Hyderabad, India
2008 establishments in Andhra Pradesh
Government agencies established in 2008